Marscholsee is a lake at San Bernardino Pass in the Grisons, Switzerland. The lake is located at an elevation of 2053 m.

Lakes of Switzerland
Lakes of Graubünden
LMarscholsee
Rheinwald